Astilbe Arendsii Group ( Astilbe × arendsii ) is a cultivar group of complex hybrids with A. astilboides, chinensis, japonica, thunbergii and others.
They are all perennial, herbaceous plants with flowers in various shades from white to purplish red.

Numerous cultivars exist, a majority of them produced by breeders in Germany and Holland. The name is derived from the German, George Arends who was responsible for nearly all hybrid cultivars currently sold in N America.

Invalid names:
Astilbe ×arendsii Arends 
Astilbe ×hybrida Ievinya & Lusinya

References

Other websites 
 Photos

Arendsii Group
Hybrid plants
Ornamental plant cultivars